John Kay Horne (17 January 1862 – 30 October 1926), or Johnny Horne, was an English footballer who played as a goalkeeper for Accrington (in six different spells), Windsor, Grimsby Town, Bury, Burslem Port Vale, Blackburn Rovers, Notts County, Burton Swifts, and Darwen. He kept goal for Blackburn as they won the 1890 FA Cup final.

Career
Horne played for Accrington (in two different spells). He put his business interests ahead of football and left Accrington for Windsor, Grimsby Town, and Bury, before he joined Burslem Port Vale in May 1886. He made his debut for the club in the final of the North Staffordshire Charity Challenge Cup on 22 May, which ended in a 1–0 defeat to nearby Stoke. He rejoined Accrington in October, before returning to Port Vale in 1887. He returned to Accrington for a fourth spell in October 1887. On 8 September 1888, he made his league debut at Anfield, then home of Everton; Accrington lost the match 2–1. He played all 22 league games in the 1888–89 season; the only other Accrington player to do so was John Stevenson. Horne played in a defensive-line that kept two clean-sheets and restricted the opposition to one goal on five separate occasions. He was described as a fine amateur goalkeeper, though he only managed to keep two clean-sheets. On 20 October 1888, Horne was part of a defence that prevented Preston North End's "The Invincibles" from scoring. Preston North End played 27 League and FA Cup matches in the 1988–89 season and their visit to Accrington was the only time they failed to score a goal. A chemist by trade, by the time he joined Blackburn Rovers he had a reputation as one of the safest goalkeepers in the country. He featured in just five competitive matches during the 1989–90 season, though one of these games was the 1890 FA Cup final, a comprehensive 6–1 victory over The Wednesday at Kennington Oval. He later played for Notts County, Accrington (in another two separate spells), Burton Swifts, and Darwen.

Career statistics
Source:

Honours
Burslem Port Vale
North Staffordshire Charity Challenge Cup runner-up: 1886

Blackburn Rovers
FA Cup: 1890

References

1862 births
1926 deaths
People from Hyndburn (district)
English footballers
Association football goalkeepers
Accrington F.C. players
Grimsby Town F.C. players
Bury F.C. players
Port Vale F.C. players
Blackburn Rovers F.C. players
Notts County F.C. players
Burton Swifts F.C. players
Darwen F.C. players
English Football League players
FA Cup Final players